Al-Mu'ayyad (Arabic: The Supporter) was a daily newspaper published in Egypt in the period 1889 to 1900. It was one of the influential dailies of that period in Egypt.

History and profile
Al-Mu'ayyad was launched by Ali Yusuf in 1889. He also edited the paper. Al-Mu'ayyad was considered anti-imperialist and pan-Islamic and received covert funding from Khedive Abbas Hilmi. It frequently published articles praising the Khedive emphasizing his closeness to his subjects.  

As of 1897 the paper had nearly six thousands subscribers like Al-Ahram and Al Muqattam. There was a heated debate between Al-Mu'ayyad and Al Muqattam during the British occupation of Egypt between 1892 and 1914 in that the latter was an ardent supporter of the British and Al-Mu'ayyad a militant supporter of the independence of Egypt.

One of the most significant contributors of Al-Mu'ayyad was Mustafa Kamil Pasha. The paper was closed down by the British authorities in 1900. Following this incident Mustafa Kamil Pasha established his own newspaper, Al Liwa, to publish his views.

References

1889 establishments in Africa
1900 disestablishments in Egypt
Arabic-language newspapers
Daily newspapers published in Egypt
Defunct newspapers published in Egypt
Newspapers established in 1889
Newspapers published in Cairo
Pan-Islamism
Publications disestablished in 1900